Robert Wayaridri (born 22 March 1971) is a New Caledonian former professional footballer who played as a defender.

References

1971 births
New Caledonian footballers
Association football defenders
Gazélec Ajaccio players
Living people
New Caledonia international footballers